Shannon Stewart may refer to:

Shannon Stewart (baseball), Major League baseball outfielder
Shannon Stewart (model), America's Next Top Model contestant and Miss Ohio USA 2004 first runner-up
Shannon Stewart (Playmate), Playboy Playmate
Shannon Stewart (poet), Canadian writer